Scott Y. Nishimoto is an American politician and a Democratic member of the Hawaii House of Representatives since January 2003 representing District 21.

Education
Nishimoto earned his Bachelor of Arts in sociology from the University of Hawaiʻi at Mānoa and his Juris Doctor from its William S. Richardson School of Law.

Elections
2012 Nishimoto won the August 11, 2012 Democratic Primary with 3,031 votes (81.4%), and was unopposed for the November 6, 2012 General election.
2002 When Republican Representative Galen Fox was redistricted to District 23, Nishimoto was unopposed for the open District 21 seat in the September 21, 2002 Democratic Primary, winning with 2,595 votes, and won the November 5, 2002 General election with 4,140 votes (52.2%) against Republican nominee Mindy Jaffe, who had sought a seat in 2000.
2004 Nishimoto was unopposed for the September 18, 2004 Democratic Primary, winning with 2,920 votes, Nishimoto won the November 2, 2004 General election with 6,689 votes (74.1%) against Republican nominee Gratia Bone.
2006 Nishimoto was unopposed for the September 26, 2006 Democratic Primary, winning with 3,775 votes, and won the November 7, 2006 General election with 5,249 votes (77.0%) against Republican nominee Mike Hu.
2008 Nishimoto was unopposed for both the September 20, 2008 Democratic Primary, winning with 2,796 votes, and the November 4, 2008 General election.
2010 Nishimoto was unopposed for the September 18, 2010 Democratic Primary, winning with 3,719 votes, and won the November 2, 2010 General election with 5,451 votes (72.5%) against Republican nominee Jay Lembeck.

References

External links
Official page at the Hawaii State Legislature

Year of birth missing (living people)
Living people
21st-century American politicians
Place of birth missing (living people)
Democratic Party members of the Hawaii House of Representatives
University of Hawaiʻi at Mānoa alumni
Hawaii politicians of Japanese descent
William S. Richardson School of Law alumni